Marjorie Stapp (September 17, 1921 – June 2, 2014) was an American actress who was mainly in low-budget pictures.

Biography
Stapp began her film career when she signed a contract with the film studio 20th Century-Fox in the 1940s. Her first screen appearance was in The Kid from Brooklyn, a 1946 film starring Danny Kaye. This was followed by another minor appearance in Linda, Be Good (1947). Eventually, she landed a leading role in the Western movie The Blazing Trail (1949) alongside Charles Starrett.

Throughout the 1950s until the 1990s, she appeared in both films and television, including Cheyenne, The George Burns and Gracie Allen Show, The Adventures of Ozzie and Harriet, The Life and Legend of Wyatt Earp, Dragnet, The Many Loves of Dobie Gillis, 77 Sunset Strip, The Brady Bunch, Quantum Leap and Columbo. Stapp retired in 1991.

Partial filmography

 The Kid from Brooklyn (1946) - Girl Greeting Burleigh at Train Station (uncredited)
 Linda, Be Good (1947) - Cameo Girl (uncredited)
 Rimfire (1949) - Mary - Saloon Girl
 Laramie (1949) - (scenes deleted, uncredited)
 The Blazing Trail (1949) - Janet Masters
 Jolson Sings Again (1949) - Nurse (uncredited)
 Miss Grant Takes Richmond (1949) - Minor Role (uncredited)
 Without Honor (1949) - Neighbor's Wife
 And Baby Makes Three (1949) - Peggy (uncredited)
 Adventures of Sir Galahad (1949, Serial) - Queen Guinevere
 The Petty Girl (1950) - Minor Role (uncredited)
 Rookie Fireman (1950) - Blonde (uncredited)
 Emergency Wedding (1952) - Mrs. Young (uncredited)
 The Steel Trap (1952) - Travel Agent
 Sword of Venus (1953) - Duchess De Villefort
 The Blue Gardenia (1953) - Policewoman (uncredited)
 Problem Girls (1953) - Bella
 Port Sinister (1953) - Technician
 A Blueprint for Murder (1953) - Nurse (uncredited)
 Marry Me Again (1953) - W.A.C. (uncredited)
 The Far Country (1954) - Girl (uncredited)
 Cell 2455 Death Row (1955) - Madeline (uncredited)
 5 Against the House (1955) - Girl (uncredited)
 Illegal (1955) - Night Orderly (uncredited)
 The Lieutenant Wore Skirts (1956) - Mother in laundromat
 Indestructible Man (1956) - Hysterical Young Woman
 Terror at Midnight (1956) - Waitress (uncredited)
 The Revolt of Mamie Stover (1956) - Minor Role (uncredited)
 The Werewolf (1956) - Min (uncredited)
 I've Lived Before (1956) - Spectator (uncredited)
 Scandal Incorporated (1956) - Alice Yoland
 Julie (1956) - Cliff's Secretary (uncredited)
 Gun for a Coward (1956) - Rose
 Kronos (1957) - Nurse
 Shoot-Out at Medicine Bend (1957) - Townswoman (uncredited)
 The Monster That Challenged the World (1957) - Connie Blake
 The Daughter of Dr. Jekyll (1957) - Woman Getting Dressed
 The Girl Most Likely (1957) - Tall Blonde (uncredited)
 Suicide Battalion (1958) - Beverly
 The Saga of Hemp Brown (1958) - Mrs. Ford (uncredited)
 The Young Captives (1959) - Murdered Blonde
 Elmer Gantry (1960) - Lady in Red on Christmas Eve (uncredited)
 Let No Man Write My Epitaph (1960) - Ruthie (uncredited)
 Battle at Bloody Beach (1961) - Caroline Pelham
 The Wild Westerners (1962) - Lily (uncredited)
 A Gathering of Eagles (1963) - Ann Morse (uncredited)

References

External links

1921 births
2014 deaths
American film actresses
American television actresses
Actresses from Little Rock, Arkansas
20th-century American actresses
21st-century American women